The 2021–22 High Point Panthers men's basketball team represented High Point University in the 2021–22 NCAA Division I men's basketball season. The Panthers, led by fourth-year head coach Tubby Smith through the first 26 games of the season and by interim head coach G. G. Smith for the remainder of the season, played their home games at the newly opened Qubein Center in High Point, North Carolina as members of the Big South Conference. With the reintroduction of divisions for the first time since the 2013–14 season, the Panthers played in the North division. They finished the season 14–17, 7–9 in Big South play to finish in a tie for third place in the North division. As the No. 7 seed in the Big South tournament, they defeated Hampton in the first round before losing to Winthrop in the quarterfinals. 

On February 16, 2022, Tubby Smith announced he was stepping down as head coach effective immediately. His son, associate head coach G. G. Smith, was named interim coach for the remainder of the season and for the 2022–23 season.

Previous season
In a season limited due to the ongoing COVID-19 pandemic, the Panthers finished the 2020–21 season 9–15, 6–11 in Big South play to finish in eighth place. They defeated USC Upstate in the first round of the Big South tournament before losing to Winthrop in the quarterfinals.

Roster

Schedule and results

|-
!colspan=12 style=| Exhibition

|-
!colspan=12 style=| Non-conference regular season

|-
!colspan=12 style=| Big South regular season

|-
!colspan=9 style=| Big South tournament

Sources

References

High Point Panthers men's basketball seasons
High Point Panthers
High Point Panthers men's basketball
High Point Panthers men's basketball